Clav or clavi may refer to:

Music
 Clavichord, a stringed keyboard instrument which produces sound by striking brass or iron strings with small metal blades
 Clavinet, an electrically amplified keyboard instrument

Other uses
 Corn (medicine), specially shaped pieces of dead skin

See also
 Clavus (disambiguation)